The Sumba brown flycatcher (Muscicapa segregata) is a species of bird in the family Muscicapidae.
It is endemic to Indonesia.

Its natural habitat is subtropical or tropical moist lowland forests.
It is threatened by habitat loss.

References

Sumba brown flycatcher
Birds of Sumba
Sumba brown flycatcher
Taxonomy articles created by Polbot